Annika Beck was the defending champion, but lost in the first round to Anna-Lena Friedsam.

Misaki Doi won the title, defeating Mona Barthel in the final, 6–4, 6–7(7–9), 6–0.

Seeds

Draw

Finals

Top half

Bottom half

Qualifying

Seeds

Qualifiers

Lucky losers

Draw

First qualifier

Second qualifier

Third qualifier

Fourth qualifier

External links 
 WTA tournament draws

BGL Luxembourg Open - Singles
2015 Singles
2015 in Luxembourgian tennis